Güleç  is a village in Anamur district of Mersin Province, Turkey. The population of Güleç is 665  as of 2011.

References

Villages in Anamur District